Royal Orbit (April 25, 1956 - c. 1980) was an American Thoroughbred racehorse best known as the winner of the Preakness Stakes, the second leg of the U.S. Triple Crown races.

Background
Royal Orbit was a chestnut horse bred by film mogul Louis B. Mayer. He was sired by the imported British stallion Royal Charger out of Admiral's Belle, a daughter of the 1937 U.S. Triple Crown winner, War Admiral. Royal Orbit was purchased at the July Keeneland Sales by businessman Jacques Braunstein and raced by his widow, Halina Gregory Braunstein. He was trained by Reggie Cornell.

Racing career
Royal Orbit was a top two-year-old colt racing in California, notably winning the 1958 Los Feliz Stakes and finishing second to Tomy Lee in the Del Mar Futurity. The following year he was second to the Hall of Fame filly Silver Spoon in the Santa Anita Derby. In his only out-of-the-money finish in twenty career races, Royal Orbit ran fourth to winner Tomy Lee in the 1959 Kentucky Derby under jockey William Harmatz. However, Royal Orbit and Harmatz came back to win the 85th running of the Preakness Stakes and in the Belmont Stakes, the final leg of the Triple Crown series, he finished third to winner Sword Dancer.

Stud record
Retired at the end of the 1959 racing season, Royal Orbit stood in Kentucky and at the Maryland branch of E.P. Taylor's Windfields Farm. His offspring would meet with modest success, the best of which was multiple stakes winner, Quicken Tree. In 1971 he was sent to a breeding farm in Ireland. Two years later he was shipped to Argentina where he spent a year before going to Brazil in 1975.

Pedigree

References

1956 racehorse births
Racehorses bred in Kentucky
Racehorses trained in the United States
Preakness Stakes winners
Thoroughbred family 7-e